Tamil Nadu has a parliamentary system as defined by its constitution, with power distributed between the state government and the districts.

The Governor of Tamil Nadu is the ceremonial head of the state. However, it is the Chief Minister of Tamil Nadu who is the leader of the party or political alliance having a majority in the state elections to the Tamil Nadu Legislative Assembly. The chief minister is the leader of the executive branch of the government of Tamil Nadu. The chief minister is the chief adviser to the governor of Tamil Nadu and the head of the state council of ministers.

Elections in Tamil Nadu are conducted every five years to elect members to the Tamil Nadu Legislative Assembly and members of parliament to the Lok Sabha. There are 234 assembly constituencies and 39 Lok Sabha constituencies. The state has conducted 16 assembly elections and 17 Lok Sabha elections since independence.

Pre-Independence elections

Madras Presidency Legislative Council election

Madras Presidency Legislative Assembly election

Post-Independence elections

Madras State Legislative Assembly election 

The Madras state was created in 1950 when India became a republic. In 1968, the name of Madras state was changed to Tamil Nadu.

Tamil Nadu Legislative Assembly election 

 : In 1952, no party could form a majority, which resulted in the first government in the state that was formed without a majority.
† : Indicates a coalition government, since no single party could gain a majority of seats.

By-elections

List of the assemblies

Lok Sabha elections 

17 Lok Sabha elections have been contested in India since independence starting 1951. The elections held in Tamil Nadu are listed below.

 Note: In 1967, DMK and its 25 newly elected MPs supported the Congress, under Indira Gandhi after the election.
 Note: Even though AIADMK supported and campaigned with Congress for the 1977 election, after the loss nationally, AIADMK and its newly elected 17 MPs supported Morarji Desai and the Janata Party and its alliance, giving them 20 seats (AIADMK, NCO) while the other 17 seats (INC, CPI) and 2 seats (DMK) were in the opposition with Indira Gandhi.

Election Maps (1977-2014)

See also 
Government of Tamil Nadu
Local Body Election in Tamil Nadu

Notes

References

External links

 Tamilnadu Election Polls 2016
 Election Commission of India
 Tamil Nadu Legislative Assembly
 Indian Elections
 Tamil Nadu Assembly Election 2011